Kalateh-ye Hajji Ali Akbar (also Romanized as Kalāteh-ye Ḩājjī ʿAlī Āḵbar; also known as Shahraḵ Qal‘eh-ye Ḩaq Kūcheḵ and Qal‘eh Jūq-e Kūchak) is a village in Gifan Rural District, Garmkhan District, Bojnord County, North Khorasan Province, Iran. At the 2006 census, its population was 396, in 83 families.

References 

Populated places in Bojnord County